"Johnny" is the first single by Suicide from their 1977 self-titled album.

Peaches version

The Canadian electronic musician Peaches covered the song in 2010, retitled as "Jonny".  The song was commissioned as part of a musical tribute series to Alan Vega, the lead singer from the band Suicide.  Other musicians who have contributed to the tribute series include The Horrors, Primal Scream, Klaxons and Bruce Springsteen.
 Her version was released as a limited-edition 10-inch vinyl, along with Effi Briest's "Universe" and Alan Vega's "No Tomorrow".

Critical reception
Robin Murray of Clash Music describes "Jonny" as a "striking cover" enhanced by Peaches' "own feminine charm".

Track listing
 "Jonny" – 2:01
 "Universe" (Effi Briest) – 6:01
 "No Tomorrow" (Alan Vega) - 3:58

References

1977 singles
2010 singles
Peaches (musician) songs
Song recordings produced by Peaches (musician)
Song recordings produced by John Shanks
Songs written by Martin Rev
Songs written by Alan Vega
1977 songs
Suicide (band) songs